SBS 1 was a geostationary communications satellite designed and manufactured by Hughes (now Boeing) on the HS-376 platform. It was ordered by Satellite Business Systems, which later sold it to Hughes Communications. It had a Ku band payload and operated on the 149°W longitude.

Satellite description 
The spacecraft was designed and manufactured by Hughes on the HS-376 satellite bus.

History 

On November 15, 1980, SBS 1 was launched by a Delta-3910 PAM-D from Cape Canaveral at 22:49 UTC.

In June 1990, SBS 1 was finally decommissioned and put into a graveyard orbit.

References

See also

 1980 in spaceflight

Communications satellites
1980 in spaceflight